Matthew Daniel Rinaldi (born April 11, 1975) is an American attorney and politician serving as the chairman of the Republican Party of Texas. Rinaldi was a member of the Texas House of Representatives for district 115 in Dallas County from 2015 to 2019 when he was defeated by Democrat Julie Johnson.

Early life and education 
Rinaldi was born in Bridgeport, Connecticut. He graduated from James Madison University in Harrisonburg, Virginia, at which he drew national attention for his successful effort to have the Pledge of Allegiance recited prior to meetings of the student government association. He graduated in 2001 with a Juris Doctor degree from Boston University School of Law.

Career 
After law school, Rinaldi became a litigation associate with the Dallas office of Gibson, Dunn & Crutcher.

Texas House of Representative 
In 2012, Rinaldi placed third in the Republican primary election for the 115th district of the Texas House of Representatives. On March 4, 2014 the one-term incumbent, Bennett Ratliff, narrowly lost re-nomination to Rinaldi, who received 4,167 votes (50.6 percent) to Ratliff's 4,075 votes (49.4 percent). Rinaldi's 2014 campaign received support from the Tea Party movement, Texans for Fiscal Responsibility, Texas Eagle Forum and Texas Right to Life, among others.

In the Republican primary held on March 1, 2016, incumbent Rinaldi held off the challenge from Ratliff who tried unsuccessfully to regain his seat. The voters favored Rinaldi, 8,804 to 7,668 (53.45 to 46.55 percent). Rinaldi narrowly held on to his House seat in the general election held on November 8, 2016. He polled 29,987 votes (50.9 percent) to 28,939 (49.1 percent) for the Democrat Dorotha M. Ocker.

84th legislative session 
During the 84th legislative session, Rinaldi served on the Agriculture & Livestock committee and the Business & Industry committee. He joint- and co-authored successful pieces of legislation that were signed into law, including: HB 11 (authorizing additional troopers for border security and strengthening smuggling laws), and HB 283 (increasing government transparency by requiring certain governmental bodies to make audio and video recordings of open meetings available online).

Rinaldi fought to eliminate or minimize the effects of the Robin Hood plan on Texas public school districts with HB 945 and HB 1411.

Rinaldi co-authored legislation that would repeal in-state tuition and end welfare benefits for undocumented immigrants as well as penalize businesses that knowingly hire undocumented immigrants.

Rinaldi was rated the number one conservative in the Texas House by a Rice University study that drew on the 1,138 non-lopsided roll call votes taken during the 2015 regular session.

85th legislative session 
During the 85th legislative session, Rinaldi served on the Agriculture & Livestock committee and the Judiciary & Civil Jurisprudence committee.

Rinaldi was, according to the Dallas Morning News, "instrumental in strengthening the punishments in the sanctuary cities ban," and authored and passed into law measures that: remove from office public officials who adopt sanctuary city policies, require government contractors and subcontractors to use e-verify, revoke pensions of teachers convicted of committing sex crimes against students, allow churches to utilize volunteers to provide security services without risking heavy fines, and prohibit any taxpayer money from going to Planned Parenthood. He also re-introduced legislation he had previously proposed to end the Robin Hood school finance system.

In May 2017, Rinaldi called Immigrations and Customs Enforcement officers on protesters inside the Capitol building. Rinaldi claimed that he called ICE after seeing individuals holding protest signs indicating they were illegal immigrants. An altercation ensued; according to multiple Hispanic Democratic lawmakers, Rinaldi got into their faces during the dispute and cursed at them. Video shot from the House floor showed both Republicans and Democrats pushing each other. Rinaldi claimed that Representative Poncho Nevárez threatened his life during the incident, which Nevárez denied. Democratic lawmaker Justin Rodriguez claimed that Rinaldi threatened to "put a bullet in one of my colleagues’ heads"; Rinaldi did not deny making the statement, but claimed it was made in self defense. Rinaldi's actions were widely seen as having a racial motivation. After the incident, state representative Ramon Romero Jr. said Rinaldi had "racially profiled every single person that was in the gallery today."

During Rinaldi's second term, he remained ranked as the most conservative legislator (tied with Briscoe Cain and Jonathan Stickland) in Austin according to a Rice University's study roll-call vote analysis drawing on 1,460 non-lopsided roll-call votes taken during the 2017 regular session. He was also named one of the Top 10 Legislators by the Conservative advocacy group Empower Texans, as well as one of the Top 10 Worst Legislators by Texas Monthly. His voting record earned a 100 score from conservative advocacy group Texans for Fiscal Responsibility.

86th legislative session campaign 
Rinaldi lost his state House seat in 2018. Rinaldi was unseated by Democrat Julie Johnson, whose campaign included volunteers that Rinaldi had called ICE on in May 2017 at the Texas Capitol. Receiving 24,512 votes (43.21 percent) versus Johnson's 32,214 votes (56.79 percent), Rinaldi received the lowest vote percentage of any House incumbent in Dallas County.

Republican Party of Texas
Rinaldi was elected Chairman of the Republican Party of Texas on July 11, 2021, to replace out-going chair, former Congressman Allen West. In his first weeks as Chairman, Rinaldi had established a reputation of being more collegial than West had been.

Personal life 
He and his wife Corley, married since 2010, attend St. Ann Catholic Parish Roman Catholic Church in Coppell.

Election history
2018

2016

2014

References

 

|-

1975 births
21st-century American politicians
Activists from Texas
Boston University School of Law alumni
Catholics from Texas
James Madison University alumni
Living people
Members of the Texas House of Representatives
People associated with Gibson Dunn
People from Irving, Texas
Tea Party movement activists
Texas lawyers
Texas Republican state chairmen
American people of Italian descent